AS Saint-Etienne won Division 1 season 1969/1970 of the French Association Football League with 56 points.

Participating teams

 AC Ajaccio
 Angers SCO
 AS Angoulême
 SEC Bastia
 Bordeaux
 Olympique Lyonnais
 Olympique de Marseille
 FC Metz
 FC Nantes
 Nîmes Olympique
 Red Star Paris
 Stade Rennais UC
 FC Rouen
 AS Saint-Etienne
 RC Paris-Sedan
 FC Sochaux-Montbéliard
 RC Strasbourg
 US Valenciennes-Anzin

League table

Promoted from Division 2, who will play in Division 1 season 1970/1971
 OGC Nice: Champion of Division 2
 AS Nancy: runner-up of Division 2
 Stade de Reims: 4th place in Division 2, but Olympique Avignonnais (3rd) was not financially strong enough to play in Division 1

Results

Top goalscorers

References

 Division 1 season 1969-1970 at pari-et-gagne.com

Ligue 1 seasons
French
1